Cassin's malimbe (Malimbus cassini) is a species of bird in the family Ploceidae.  It is found in Cameroon, Central African Republic, Republic of the Congo, Democratic Republic of the Congo, Equatorial Guinea, Gabon, and Ghana.

References

External links
 Cassin's malimbe -  Species text in Weaver Watch.

Cassin's malimbe
Birds of Central Africa
Cassin's malimbe
Taxonomy articles created by Polbot